Failing Building may refer to one of these historic buildings in Portland, Oregon, United States named for the Failing family:

Failing Office Building, 1913, 620 SW 5th Ave.
Oregon Marine Supply Building, 1886, also known as the Failing Building, 235 SW 1st Ave. 
(contributing property to the Portland Skidmore/Old Town Historic District)
Postal Building (Portland, Oregon), 1902, also known as the Failing Building, 510 SW 3rd Ave.